Deldoul may refer to:

 Deldoul, Adrar, a municipality or commune of Adrar province, Algeria
 Deldoul, Djelfa, a municipality or commune of Djelfa province, Algeria